Monte Boglia (also known as Colma Regia) is a mountain whose peak is along the border of Ticino, Switzerland and Lombardy, Italy. It reaches an elevation of 1,516 metres and overlooks Lake Lugano on its southern side.

References

External links
Monte Boglia on Hikr
 Lugano Monte Brè

Mountains of the Alps
Mountains of Lombardy
Mountains of Ticino
One-thousanders of Switzerland
Mountains of Switzerland